This is a listing of Australian rules footballers to have made their debut with a club for the Australian Football League season 2006.

Debuts

References

Australian rules football records and statistics
2006 in Australian rules football
Australian rules football-related lists
2006 Australian Football League season